Piquette is a type of wine made from pomace.

Piquette may also refer to:
 Ford Piquette Avenue Plant, a Ford Motor Company automobile production plant
 Léo Piquette (born 1946), member of the Alberta Legislative Assembly

See also
 Picket (disambiguation)
 Pickett (disambiguation)
 Picquet (disambiguation)
 Piquet (disambiguation)